Karl Konrad Kaschka (8 January 1904 – 4 December 1941) was an Austrian fencer. He competed as captain of Austria in the team sabre event at the 1936 Summer Olympics in Austria, where his team scored fifth. 

Being member of the German Air Force, he was killed in action during World War II when his plane was shot down in Al-Marj, Libya.

References

External links
 

1904 births
1941 deaths
Austrian male sabre fencers
Olympic fencers of Austria
Fencers at the 1936 Summer Olympics
Luftwaffe personnel killed in World War II
Fencers from Vienna
Military personnel from Vienna